The Țibleș Mountains (or Széples)  are a volcanic mountain range located in Maramureș County, in northern Romania. They belong to the Vihorlat-Gutin Area of the Inner Eastern Carpathians. 

They are located at the southern border of historical Maramureș region and they cut off the Maramureș valleys from the rest of Romania. The closest town is Dragomirești.

See also

 Romanian Carpathians

References

Sources

External links
 Țibleș Mountains on the geographical map of Maramureș County

Mountain ranges of Romania
Mountain ranges of the Eastern Carpathians